XII Corps is a corps of the Indian Army and one of the two corps in the Pune-based Southern Command.

Formation
With two combat divisions on the order of battle of Southern Command and increasing operational importance of the desert sector, by January 1987, a Corps Headquarters was sanctioned. HQ 12 Corps was raised at Jodhpur during the volatile days of Operation Trident. The corps, which came into existence on the auspicious day of Maha Shivaratri on February 26, 1987 is charged with protection of the desert sectors of the country falling in Rajasthan and Gujarat states and was raised under Lieutenant General A K Chatterjee as the first General Officer Commanding (GOC). Also referred to as Desert Corps within the army, the corps adopted Konark as its formation insignia after the Konark Sun Temple of Puri as a symbolic representation of the radiation of the sun in eight cardinal directions, thereby establishing a spiritual link with the Sun City - Jodhpur.

Composition

XII corps currently consists of:
11 Infantry Division (Golden Katar Division) headquartered at Ahmedabad, Gujarat
12 Infantry Division (Battle Axe Division) headquartered at Jaisalmer, Rajasthan. The 140 Armoured Brigade forms part of this division and has two regiments equipped with Arjun tanks.
75 (Independent) Infantry Brigade (Bald Eagle Brigade) at Bhuj, Gujarat.
4 (Independent) Armoured Brigade (Black Mace Brigade)
340 (Independent) Mechanised Brigade (earlier 34th Independent Infantry Brigade) (Amphibious)

Humanitarian assistance
The corps has been intimately involved in providing succor to citizens of India in times of natural calamities such as earthquakes and floods most noteworthy being Bhuj earthquake, floods in Rajasthan and Gujarat as well as the recent floods in southern state of Kerala.

List of General Officer Commanding

References 

012
Military units and formations established in 1987